Detained is a 2015 political thriller written by Don Brown. It was initially released in April 2015.

Plot
The novel's storyline explores tortuous conditions at the Guantanamo Bay Detention Camp, and centers around a U.S. Navy Petty officer who is falsely arrested and sent to the camp, and a U.S. Navy JAG defense counsel's efforts to free him. In the story, Hasan Makari and his son Najib, both Lebanese nationals, have dreamed of moving to America. But when they arrive in the US, they are arrested, accused of terrorism, and incarcerated at the Guantanamo Bay prison camp in Cuba, all on false charges. Suddenly, they face the nightmare of death by execution. Their only hope is Navy JAG Officer Matt Davis, who has been assigned to the case of his life, to defend the Makaris in court at Guantanamo Bay. 
  
Detained is the first novel in Don Brown's Navy JAG series.

References

2015 American novels
American thriller novels
Political thriller novels
Legal thriller novels
American political novels
Zondervan books